The 2013 Florida Tech Panthers football team represented the Florida Institute of Technology (FIT) during the NCAA Division II football season.  They were led by head coach Steve Englehart, who was in his first year at Florida Tech.  The Panthers played their home games at Pirate Stadium, approximately one mile from the Florida Tech campus and were a member of the Gulf South Conference.  The 2013 season was the Panthers' first, after having football approved at FIT in April, 2010.

In a season full of firsts, the Panthers memorably won their first ever game by defeating Stetson, 20-13, on a touchdown with 1:09 to play. Later on, they would earn their first GSC win in dramatic fashion by scoring 21 unanswered fourth quarter points to defeat Shorter, 28-24. They would cap their inaugural campaign by winning on the road for the first time in their first ever bowl game in a 32-20 win over Alderson-Broaddus in the ECAC Futures Bowl.

Schedule

Game summaries

Stetson

at Newberry

West Alabama

at Delta State

at Valdosta State

at Ave Maria

Shorter

Warner

at West Georgia

North Alabama

Webber International

at Alderson-Broaddus

Awards and milestones

Gulf South Conference honors
Eight players from Florida Tech were honored as All-GSC selections by the league's coaches. Linebacker Chris Stapleton was named the GSC Defensive Freshman of the Year, becoming the first Panther to receive any such honor.

Gulf South Conference Defensive Freshman of the Year: LB Chris Stapleton

Gulf South Conference All-Conference First Team

Xavier Milton, WR
Gabe Hughes, TE

Gulf South Conference All-Conference Second Team

Bobby Vega, QB
Ramsey Sellers, G
Skylar Sheffield, DL
Justin Arcune, LB
Chris Stapleton, LB
Manny Abad, DB

Gulf South Conference special teams player of the week
September 16: Brion Ashley

References

Florida Tech
Florida Tech Panthers football seasons
Florida Tech Panthers football